Alaa El-Din Hassanin El-Hamouly (4 July 1930 – 13 January 1984) was an Egyptian former footballer who played as a forward for Zamalek. He also played for the Egyptian national team. He was part of the squad that won the 1957 Africa Cup of Nations, and represented his country in the 1952 and 1960 Summer Olympics.

Honours
 Africa Cup of Nations: 1957

References

1930 births
1984 deaths
Footballers from Cairo
Egyptian footballers
Association football forwards
Egypt international footballers
Zamalek SC players
1957 African Cup of Nations players
Olympic footballers of Egypt
Footballers at the 1952 Summer Olympics
Footballers at the 1960 Summer Olympics
Africa Cup of Nations-winning players